Martin Schröder may refer to:

 Martin Schröder (chemist) (born 1954), professor of inorganic chemistry
 Martin Schröder (aviator) (born 1931), founder of Martinair